Phú Quốc National Park is a national park on Phú Quốc Island, in the Kiên Giang Province of Vietnam's Mekong Delta Region. This park includes land and sea area, protecting oceanic species such as dugong.
This park was established by the Decision 91/2001/QĐ-TTg dated 8 June 2001 signed by the Prime Minister of Vietnam on upgrading Northern Phú Quốc Islands Preservation Zone to Phu Quoc National Park.

Location
Phu Quoc National Park includes Northern Phú Quốc Islands Preservation Zone, Ham Rong Mount, Ganh Dau and Cua Can. The park is situated within the boundaries of Communes: Gành Dầu, Bãi Thơm, Cửa Cạn and part of Communes of Cửa Dương, Hàm Ninh, Dương Tơ, and Dương Đông Township, Phú Quốc District, Kiên Giang Province.

The geographical coordinates: N 10°12' to 10°27' and E 103°50' to 104°04'.

Areas
The park covers 31,422 ha, comprising 8,603 ha strictly protected area, 22,603 ha biological restoration area, and 33 ha for administration and service.

References
Phu Quoc National Park

National parks of Vietnam
Geography of Kiên Giang province
Protected areas established in 2001
Cardamom Mountains rain forests